Ólafur Jóhann Sigurðsson (26 September 1918 – 30 July 1988) was an Icelandic novelist, short story writer and poet.

His style was social realism. His published works include five volumes of short stories, six novels, two short novels, four children's books and four collections of poetry. His writings have been translated into eighteen languages.

In 1976 Ólafur Jóhann was awarded the Nordic Council's Literature Prize for his poetry collections Að laufferjum (At the Leaf-Ferry) and Að brunnum (By the Spring). Two books of his work are available in English; the novella Pastor Bodvar's Letter (Bréf séra Böðvars) from Penumbra Press, and the short story collection The Stars of Constantinople from Louisiana State University Press.

Ólafur Jóhann Sigurðsson was the father of Ólafur Jóhann Ólafsson, also a novelist and a short story writer.

Bibliography
1934 Við Álftavatn
1935 Um sumarkvöld
1936 Skuggarnir af bænum
1940 Liggur vegurinn þangað ?
1940 Kvistir í altarinu
1944 Fjallið og draumurinn
1945 Teningar í tafli
1947 Speglar og fiðrildi
1947 Litbrigði jarðarinnar
1951 Vorköld jörð
1952 Nokkrar vísur um veðrið og fleira
1955 Gangvirkið
1955 Á vegamótum
1959 Ljósir dagar
1965 Leynt og ljóst
1965 Bréf séra Böðvars
1972 Seint á ferð
1972 Að laufferjum
1972 Hreiðrið
1974 Að brunnum

1977 Seiður og hélog
1978 Virki og vötn
1979 Í gestanauð : sögur 1940–1945
1979 Margs er að gæta : sögur 1945–1962
1983 Drekar og smáfuglar. Úr fórum blaðamanns
1988 Að lokum. Kvæði.
1993 Sagnaúrval 1939–1965
1995 Kvæði

References

Olafur Johann Sigurdsson
Olafur Johann Sigurdsson
Nordic Council Literature Prize winners
1918 births
1988 deaths